Kurt Schütte (14 October 1909, Salzwedel – 18 August 1998, Munich) was a German mathematician who worked on proof theory and ordinal analysis. The Feferman–Schütte ordinal, which he showed to be the precise  ordinal bound for predicativity, is named after him. He was the doctoral advisor of 16 students, including Wolfgang Bibel, Wolfgang Maaß, Wolfram Pohlers, and Martin Wirsing.

Publications

 Beweistheorie, Springer, Grundlehren der mathematischen Wissenschaften, 1960; new edition trans. into English as Proof Theory, Springer-Verlag 1977
 Vollständige Systeme modaler und intuitionistischer Logik, Springer 1968
 with Wilfried Buchholz: Proof Theory of Impredicative Subsystems of Analysis, Bibliopolis, Naples 1988
 with Helmut Schwichtenberg: Mathematische Logik, in Fischer, Hirzebruch et al. (eds.) Ein Jahrhundert Mathematik 1890-1990, Vieweg 1990

References

External links
 Kurt Schütte at the Mathematics Genealogy Project

1909 births
1998 deaths
People from Salzwedel
People from the Province of Saxony
Mathematical logicians
20th-century German mathematicians